Jake Zamansky may refer to:

 Jake Zamansky (lawyer), securities arbitration attorney based in New York, NY
 Jake Zamansky (skier) (born 1981), American alpine ski racer